The Baltimore Rockets were an American soccer club based in Baltimore, Maryland that was a member of the American Soccer League.

Before the 1957/58 season the team was renamed Baltimore Pompeii. The club folded after playing six games in the 1960/61 season.

Year-by-year

References

P
Defunct soccer clubs in Maryland
American Soccer League (1933–1983) teams
1953 establishments in Maryland
1961 disestablishments in Maryland
Association football clubs established in 1953
Association football clubs disestablished in 1961